Kevin Lacroix (born March 14, 1989) is a Canadian racing driver from Saint-Eustache, Quebec.

History

After karting, Lacroix drove in Formula BMW USA in 2005 and finished second with four wins. In 2006 he competed in the Star Mazda Series for John Walko Racing and finished second in points with five podium finishes but no wins. 2007 saw him compete in eight races in the second half of the Atlantic Championship season for Brooks Associates Racing. He won in his second start at Portland International Raceway. In 2008 he competed in the full Atlantic Championship schedule for Walker Racing. He finished 9th in points with a best finish of second in the season finale at Road Atlanta.

NASCAR Canadian Tire Series

Lacroix made his NASCAR Canadian Tire Series debut at the 2015 Pinty's Presents the Clarington 200 at Canadian Tire Motorsport Park. His debut would end quickly though as he crashed out of the race on lap four, finishing 26th. Lacroix's second start came at Circuit ICAR where he would dominate the day, taking the lead on lap two from veteran Alex Tagliani and never looking back on his way to his first career win. Lacroix won his second race of the year at Circuit de Trois-Rivieres, again in impressive fashion.

Lacroix is the only driver in Canadian Tire Series history to notch wins in two of his first four starts.

Motorsports career results

NASCAR
(key) (Bold – Pole position awarded by qualifying time. Italics – Pole position earned by points standings or practice time. * – Most laps led. ** – All laps led.)

Pinty's Series

 Season still in progress
 Ineligible for series points

References

External links
 
Kevin Lacroix official website

1989 births
Atlantic Championship drivers
Racing drivers from Quebec
Formula BMW USA drivers
Living people
People from Saint-Eustache, Quebec
Indy Pro 2000 Championship drivers

Walker Racing drivers
NASCAR drivers